The East Germany national athletics team represented East Germany at the international athletics competitions such as Olympic Games or World Athletics Championships.

History
After the defeat in World War II, Germany was not invited to various events, and appeared at the Olympic Games for the first time in Helsinki 1952 and for the next three editions afterwards competed as one team, up to and including the 1964 Olympic Games in Tokyo.  Germany’s first appearance at the European Championships after the war was in Bern 1954, and even before the construction of the Berlin Wall (1961-1989) at the European Championships competed as two separate teams (East Germany and West Germany), in the 1958 and 1962 Championships, and this continued up to 1990, for the last time at the European Championships in Split 1990).

Medal count
East Germany has 5 participations in the Summer Olympic of 28 editions held from 1896 to 2016.

See also
East Germany at the Olympics
German records in athletics
Athletics Summer Olympics medal table
World Championships medal table
European Championships medal table
Deutscher Leichtathletik-Verband
Doping in East Germany

References

External links
East Germany Athletics at Summer Olympics

National team
Athletics
East Germany